Antigua and Barbuda does not have any permanent rivers.  Following is a list of streams in Antigua.  Barbuda does not have any streams.

Antigua

Ayers Creek
Cooks Creek
Fitches Creek

References
Water Resources Assessment of Dominica, Antigua, Barbuda, St. Kitts and Nevis 
, GEOnet Names Server

 
Antigua and Barbuda
Antigua
Antigua and Barbuda geography-related lists